John Christopher Kirkbride (born 24 March 1947) is a retired British international middle-distance runner. He competed in the men's 1500 metres at the 1972 Summer Olympics.

He also represented England in the 1,500 metres, at the 1970 British Commonwealth Games in Edinburgh, Scotland. Four years later he competed once again in the 1,500 metres at the 1974 British Commonwealth Games in Christchurch, New Zealand.

References

1947 births
Living people
Athletes (track and field) at the 1972 Summer Olympics
Athletes (track and field) at the 1970 British Commonwealth Games
Athletes (track and field) at the 1974 British Commonwealth Games
British male middle-distance runners
Olympic athletes of Great Britain
Sportspeople from Whitehaven
Universiade silver medalists for Great Britain
Universiade medalists in athletics (track and field)
Medalists at the 1970 Summer Universiade
Commonwealth Games competitors for England